Giljin (also Romanized as Gilchīn; also known as Galjīn, Gil’dzhin, Giljin, Goljīn, and Jeljīn) is a village in Qara Poshtelu-e Bala Rural District, Qara Poshtelu District, Zanjan County, Zanjan Province, Iran. As of the 2006 census, its population was 185, in 44 families.

References 

Populated places in Zanjan County